Abid Ali Jaferbhai (1899/1900 - 26 June 1973) was a leader of Congress(I) from Bombay, Maharashtra.

He became a member of the Bombay Legislative Council in 1947. He was a founder member of the Indian National Trade Union Congress and its Vice-President. As such, he was closely related to the Governing Body of the International Labour Office (ILO). For four terms during 3 April 1952 to 3 April 1970 Abid Ali served as member of Rajya Sabha. He was Union Deputy Minister for Labour during 1952-1962.

He was born on in 1899 or 1900. He died in 1973 and survived by three sons and one daughter.

He was living in Mazgaon, Bombay

References

Year of birth uncertain
1973 deaths
People from Mumbai City district
Ali Abid Jaferbhai
Union deputy ministers of India